Sławomir Cieślakowski (born 2 May 1961) is a Polish rower. He competed in the men's quadruple sculls event at the 1988 Summer Olympics.

References

1961 births
Living people
Polish male rowers
Olympic rowers of Poland
Rowers at the 1988 Summer Olympics
Rowers from Warsaw